The Roper River is a large perennial river located in the Katherine region of the Northern Territory of  Australia.

Location and features
The river is joined by fifteen tributaries including the Chambers, Strangways, Jalboi, Hodgson and the Wilton Rivers. Mataranka Hot Springs and the township of Mataranka lie close to the river at its western end. Port Roper lies near its mouth on Limmen Bight.

Etymology
The first European to explore the Roper River was Ludwig Leichhardt in 1845 as he made his way from Moreton Bay to Port Essington. Leichhardt crossed the river at Roper Bar, a rocky shelf which conveniently lies at the high tide limit on the river. He named the river after John Roper, a member of the expedition.

Roper River Mission 
 
The Roper River Mission was established by the Church of England Missionary Society in 1908. After it was closed in 1968, the government took over management of the community. In 1988, control of the town was handed to the Yugul Mangi Community Government Council, and the township was renamed Ngukurr.

See also

List of rivers of Northern Territory

References

Rivers of the Northern Territory